"Something Happened on the Way to Heaven" is a song by English drummer Phil Collins, released in April 1990 from his fourth studio album, ...But Seriously (1989). The song peaked at  4 on the US Billboard Hot 100 chart and No. 15 on the UK Singles Chart. A live version also appears on the Serious Hits... Live! album. The song is often identified by the recurring hook of "How many times can I say 'I'm sorry'?".

The song was written by Phil Collins and longtime Genesis/Collins guitarist Daryl Stuermer and was produced by Collins and Hugh Padgham. It was also included on ...Hits. The song was originally written for the movie The War of the Roses.

Artworks
The single's UK release featured comedian Tony Hancock on its front cover.  The different cover art for the international single release is a still from the 1946 film A Matter of Life and Death (also titled in the US Stairway to Heaven) created by Powell and Pressburger, permitted for use by Rank Film Distributors.

Music video
Directed by Jim Yukich, produced by Paul Flattery and written by both of them for FYI. A dog is napping in a meadow, dreaming of being in a silent movie in which it saves a woman tied to a set of railroad tracks from being run over by a train. The opening of the song is heard faintly in the distance, coming from the open back door of a concert hall, and the dog wakes up and ventures inside. Here, Collins and his band do a sound check and then perform the song as the dog explores the facility, eating from the band's buffet table, climbing among the catwalks, and sitting briefly at Collins' piano and drum kit. These sequences are intercut with shots from the dog's black-and-white perspective, including a brief dream in which it sits at a formal table loaded with food.

At two different times, the dog relieves itself onstage, first by defecating near backing singer Arnold McCuller — only discovered when he steps in the resulting mess — then later by urinating on bassist Leland Sklar's leg. The latter occurs near the end of the song, and the video ends after Collins smiles and wipes Sklar's shoe with a towel (Sklar did not perform on the actual studio recording, Nathan East is the actual performer).

Formats and track listings
CD maxi
 "Something Happened on the Way to Heaven" – 4:37
 "Something Happened on the Way to Heaven" (One World Remix) – 5:38
 "I Wish It Would Rain Down" (demo) – 5:19

7-inch single
 "Something Happened on the Way to Heaven" (edit) – 4:37
 "I Wish It Would Rain Down" (demo) – 5:19

12-inch maxi
 "Something Happened on the Way to Heaven" – 4:37
 "Something Happened on the Way to Heaven" (One World Remix) – 5:38
 "I Wish It Would Rain Down" (demo) – 5:19

Credits
 Phil Collins – vocals, keyboards, drums
 Daryl Stuermer – guitars
 Dominic Miller – guitars
 Nathan East – bass
 The Phenix Horns
 Don Myrick – saxophone
 Louis Satterfield – trombone
 Harry Kim – trumpet
 Rahmlee Michael Davis – trumpet
 Arranged by Tom Tom 84
 Alex Brown – backing vocals
 Lynne Fiddmont – backing vocals
 Marva King – backing vocals

Charts

Weekly charts

Year-end charts

Deborah Cox version

In 2003, Canadian singer Deborah Cox recorded a R&B cover of the track, which was included on the Phil Collins tribute compilation Urban Renewal. It peaked at No. 95 on the Billboard Hot 100. A club/house remix was issued as a single, which reached No. 1 on the U.S. Billboard Hot Dance Airplay chart in November 2003 and stayed at the top spot until February 2004. The track spent 11 weeks at No. 1—10 of them consecutively—making it the first single on the chart to accomplish this feat, which she would hold until 2009, when Lady Gaga broke that record with her single "Poker Face", which spent 15 weeks at the top.

References

1990 singles
2003 singles
Phil Collins songs
Deborah Cox songs
Dance-pop songs
Electronic songs
House music songs
RPM Top Singles number-one singles
Song recordings produced by Hugh Padgham
Song recordings produced by Phil Collins
1989 songs
Atlantic Records singles
Virgin Records singles
Warner Music Group singles
Songs written by Daryl Stuermer